David Poile (born February 14, 1950) is a Canadian ice hockey executive and former player. He is the president of hockey operations and general manager for the Nashville Predators of the National Hockey League (NHL). He is the son of the former NHL player, coach and executive Bud Poile.

Career
Poile was a successful hockey player at Northeastern University, still holding the record for most career hat tricks with 11. While at Northeastern Poile was a member of Phi Sigma Kappa fraternity. Poile began his career in the NHL as an administrative assistant with the then-expansion Atlanta Flames in 1972. Five years after joining the Flames organization he was named as the assistant general manager.

Poile left the Flames to become the vice president and general manager of the Washington Capitals. He served in that capacity for 15 years. During his time in Washington, the Capitals amassed a 594–454–124 record under his management.

After working in Washington, Poile took the position with the then-expansion Nashville Predators in 1997. He has proven to make many shrewd moves and has created a competitive team with a limited budget, and has been the team's only general manager in the franchise's history to date.

Poile served as general manager of the 1998 and 1999 U.S. National Team for the International Ice Hockey Federation World Championships. Poile also served as the general manager for the men's hockey team at the 2014 Olympics, though he was unable to attend the games in Sochi due to a hit in the face with an errant puck during a Nashville Predators morning skate just days prior to his planned departure. He has since not been able to see out of his right eye.

He was awarded the Lester Patrick Trophy in 2001, making him and his father Norman 'Bud' Poile one of six father-son combinations to win the award. In 2017, he won the NHL's General Manager of the Year award after the Predators reached the Stanley Cup Finals for the first time in franchise history.

On March 1, 2018, David Poile became the most successful general manager in NHL history, as the Nashville Predators defeated the Edmonton Oilers 4–2, giving him his 1,320th win as a general manager, surpassing Glen Sather who had won 1,319 games. On February 26, 2023, Poile announced that he would retire on June 30, 2023.

Awards and honors

References

External links
 
 Profile at Predators official website

1950 births
Living people
Atlanta Flames personnel
Calgary Flames executives
Canadian ice hockey right wingers
Ice hockey people from Toronto
Lester Patrick Trophy recipients
Nashville Predators executives
Nashville Predators general managers
Northeastern Huskies men's ice hockey players
Rochester Americans players
Washington Capitals executives